Hendtheer Darbar is a 2010 Indian Kannada language comedy-drama film written and directed by V. Sekhar and produced by G. Ramachandran. The film stars Ramesh Aravind and Meena along with Rangayana Raghu and Sadhu Kokila in pivotal roles. The film is a remake of Sekhar's own Tamil film Varavu Ettana Selavu Pathana released 16 years ago in 1994.

The film released on 29 June 2010 across Karnataka. The film was a sleeper hit at the box-office with the collections picking up slowly after the release.

Cast 
 Ramesh Aravind as Shivaramu
 Meena as Radha
 Rangayana Raghu 
 Sadhu Kokila
 Ambika Soni
 G. Ramachandran
 Anantha Velu
 Layendra
 Preethi

Soundtrack

Reception

Critical response 

A critic from The Times of India scored the film at 2.5 out of 5 stars and says "Ramesh delivers a brilliant performance, shining in the dishum dishum sequences too, while Meena is simply superb. The role of the MLA (GR) with a Tamil accent in indigestible. Rangayana Raghu impresses. Music by Sadhu Kokila and camera by Raju Mahendra are average". BSS from Deccan Herald wrote "The first half of “Hendthir...” impresses with a tight screenplay and, some believable dialogues by S Mohan with little in terms of vulgarity. It is in the second half, however, that the film slips".

References 

2010 films
2010s Kannada-language films
Indian comedy-drama films
2010 comedy-drama films
Kannada remakes of Tamil films
Films directed by V. Sekhar